Fotbal Club Botoșani , commonly known as FC Botoșani or simply Botoșani, is a Romanian professional football club based in the city of Botoșani, Botoșani County, that competes in the Liga I.

In 2013, twelve years after being established, FC Botoșani became the first team from its county to be promoted to the top tier of the Romanian league system. It recorded its first European appearance in the 2015–16 UEFA Europa League season.

Botoșănenii play in predominantly white home kits, while their away equipment is generally blue. Their home ground is the 7,782-seater Municipal stadium.

History

Predecessors
Before World War II, the main local team of the city of Botoșani was Venus. After the war ended, the team was successively named Flamura Roșie, Textila and Unirea, and played mostly in the regional championship and the third division (Divizia C) without significant performances. In 1973, the team was renamed CS Botoșani. It won their series in the 1974–75 Divizia C and promoted for the first time to Divizia B, but only for a year. The team played again in Divizia B in the 1977–78 season, but was again relegated.

In the summer of 1979, CS Botoșani promoted for the third time to Divizia B, and at the end of the 1979–80 season, they obtained the highest position of 3rd; that had heretofore not been reached by any football team from Botoșani. After that performance, the team declined, occupying places in the middle of the league, reaching in the ending of '80s near relegation.

One of the most famous Romanian players, Nicolae Dobrin, ended his career at CS Botoșani. He played for the team in the 1985–86 season and was also the team manager.

CS Botoșani remained in Divizia B for 11 seasons, the most seasons spent by a football team from Botoșani. After that, at the ending of 1989–90 season the team was relegated to Divizia C. In 1993, the team was relegated to the county division and disbanded.

There was also a Unirea Botoșani team that played between 1998 and 2000. The team merged with Poli Iași, who played in Divizia C under the name Poli Unirea Iași.

Founding and early years (2001–2013)
The new Fotbal Club Botoșani was founded in 2001 by Salavastru and Sfaițer, with support from the local council, and started in Divizia C. In the summer of 2004, the team promoted to Divizia B.

In 2005 the president of the Administration Council, Valeriu Iftimie, took over the main projects of the club after the French model. Therefore, the first team played in Divizia B, the second team, formed with youngsters, played in the third league. Also, the club has a centre for children and youths who are prepared for the future of the first team.

Since the 2005–06 season, the matches of FC Botoșani were transmitted live on the radio, on "Radio AS". Until the beginning of the season, not even a radio station transmitted live. FC Botoșani participated in the second division of the Romanian football for nine consecutive seasons. In the 2005–06 season it finished on the 4th place, which was the highest position obtained until the 2012–13 season, when FC Botoșani won the series and promoted for the first time in Liga 1.

Promotion to the first division and recent history (2013–present)
The main objective for the 2013–14 season was to avoid relegation. At the start of the season, FC Botoșani was the only first league team that had only Romanian players. FC Botoșani made their debut in Liga I on 21 July 2013, in a 0–0 draw against CFR Cluj, with eight newcomers in a top tier level of the starting eleven and played the most of the match with nine-man as Ciprian Dinu received a red card in the ninth minute. The next matchday, on 26 July, saw FC Botoșani netting their first Liga I victory, in a 2–1 away win over Gaz Metan Mediaș. On 25 August, FC Botoșani beat 1–0 FC Vaslui to record their first ever home win in the top tier. However, after this record, Botoșani had a poor run and manager Cristian Popovici was sacked, letting the team on the 12th place, two points above relegation. Leontin Grozavu was named manager and lead the team to a tough fight to avoid relegation.

FC Botoșani started the next season with two important victories against Astra Giurgiu and Dinamo București, teams that fought for the championship title. At the end of the season they qualified for the first time ever in 2015–16 season of UEFA Europa League, because several clubs failed to obtain UEFA licences. After a 4–4 draw with Viitorul Constanța, Botoșani again finished in eighth place.

On 2 July 2015, FC Botoșani made their debut in European competitions, in the first qualifying round of UEFA Europa League in a 1–1 tie against Spartaki Tskhinvali in the first leg in Botoșani. In the second leg in Georgia, FC Botoșani netted their first European victory in a 3–1 win over Spartaki Tskhinvali to advance to the next round, where they met Legia Warsaw.

After their first qualification in the championship play-offs, FC Botoșani finished the 2019–20 season on the 4th place, thus achieving their best Liga I performance and, once again, qualifying for UEFA Europa League after 5 years since their last participation. They netted a 2–1 away victory against Kazakh side Ordabasy in the first round, before eventually being eliminated by Shkëndija of North Macedonia after a 0–1 home loss in the second round.

Stadium
FC Botoșani plays its home matches at the Botoșani Municipal Stadium. It is located near the centre of the city, has a capacity of 7,782 seats and is equipped with an all-weather running track.

Support
The ultras of FC Botoșani are organized under the name of Dark Hooligans, Renegații and BT Pride.

Rivalries
The main rivalry of Botoșani is with Foresta Suceava, but they recently developed a rivalry with Politehnica Iași.

Honours

Domestic

Leagues
Liga II
Winners (1): 2012–13
Liga III
Winners (1): 2003–04
Runners-up (1): 2001-02

Players

First-team squad

Out on loan

Club officials

Board of directors

 Last updated: 6 September 2022
 Source:

Current technical staff

 Last updated: 11 December 2022
 Source:

Records and statistics

European Cups history 

Notes

 1Q: First qualifying round
 2Q: Second qualifying round
 3Q: Third qualifying round
 PO: Play-off round

European cups all-time statistics

League history

Notable former players
The footballers enlisted below have had international cap(s) for their respective countries at junior and/or senior level and/or more than 50 caps for FC Botoșani.

Romania
  Florin Acsinte
  Gabriel Vașvari
  Andrei Miron
  Ștefan Apostol
  Andrei Burcă
  Valeriu Bordeanu
  Mihai Bordeianu
  Laurențiu Buș
  Andrei Chindriș
  Marius Croitoru
  István Fülöp
  Lóránd Fülöp
  Attila Hadnagy
  Olimpiu Moruțan 
  Paul Papp 
  Răzvan Tincu
  Nicolae Mușat
  Ciprian Dinu
  Vasile Curileac
  Stelian Cucu
  Florin Plămadă
  George Cârjan
  Alberto Cobrea
  Răzvan Oaidă
  Paul Batin
  Andrei Dumitraș
  Denis Haruț
  Bogdan Racovițan
  David Lazar
Albania
  Enriko Papa
  Realdo Fili
 
Argentina
  Jonathan Rodríguez
Bulgaria
  Radoslav Dimitrov
  Plamen Iliev
Cameroon
  Michael Ngadeu-Ngadjui
  Joyskim Dawa
Croatia
  Marko Dugandžić
Curaçao
  Quenten Martinus
France
  Hamidou Keyta
  Hervin Ongenda
Germany
  Reagy Ofosu
  Christopher Braun
Greece
  Aristidis Soiledis
Italy
  Diego Fabbrini 
Lithuania
  Deivydas Matulevičius
North Macedonia
  Stefan Ashkovski
Syria
  Mahmoud Al-Mawas

Notable former managers

  Liviu Ciobotariu
  Marius Croitoru
  Costel Enache
  Leontin Grozavu 
  Cristian Pustai 
  Cristian Popovici

References

External links
 
 
 Club profile on UEFA's official website
 Club profile on LPF's official website

 
Football clubs in Botoșani County
Botoșani
Association football clubs established in 2001
Liga I clubs
Liga II clubs
Liga III clubs
2001 establishments in Romania